Brian Gilbert may refer to:

Brian Gilbert (director), English film director
Brian Gilbert (tennis) (1887–1974), English tennis player
, American performer, musician, and comedian; former video producer for Polygon (website)